Tor Nørretranders (born 20 June 1955) is a Danish author of popular science. He was born in Copenhagen, Denmark. His books and lectures have primarily been focused on light popular science and its role in society, often with Nørretranders' own advice about how society should integrate new findings in popular science. He introduced the notion of exformation in his book The User Illusion.

Biography
Tor Nørretranders' mother is Yvonne Levy (1920–) and his father was Bjarne Nørretranders (1922–1986). Tor Nørretranders graduated at "Det frie gymnasium" in 1973 and reached a cand.techn.soc-degree from Roskilde University (Roskilde) in 1982, specialized in environment planning and its scientific theoretic basis. He lives north of Copenhagen with his wife Rikke Ulk and three children.

Other academic accomplishments
 The Technical University of Denmark from 1982 to 1983
 The Danish Royal Academy of Art 1990–1991
 Adjunct Professor of the philosophy of science at Copenhagen Business School since 2003.

Journalism background
 Information (Danish Paper) 1975–1982
 Weekendavisen (Danish Paper) 1983–1985
 Børsens Nyhedsmagasin (Danish Paper) 1985–1986
 Danmarks Radio TV-K (Danish TV-station) 1986–1988
 Chaos 1988–1990 (company producing science journalism and television)
 Has received 'Dansk Forfatterforenings Faglitterære Pris 1985' (The Danish Society of Authors' Non-Fiction Prize 1985) and 'Publicistprisen 1988' (The Publicist Prize 1988)

Bibliography
 Grønt lys (2008), Verve Books
 Glæd dig (2007), TV2 Forlag
 Børnespørgehjørne (2007), Thaning & Appel
 Civilisation 2.0 (2007), Thaning & Appel
 The Generous Man (2005),  (English edition of Det generøse menneske)
 Einstein, Einstein (2005), Politikens Forlag (Biography on Albert Einstein)
 Menneskeføde (2005), Tiderne skifter
 At tro på at tro (2003), Anis
 Det generøse menneske. En naturhistorie om at umage giver mage. (2002), People'sPress
 Frem i tiden (1999), Tiderne Skifter
 The User Illusion (1998),  (English edition of Mærk verden)
 Stedet som ikke er (1997), Aschehoug
 Person på en planet (1995), Aschehoug 
 Verden vokser (1994), Aschehoug
 Mærk verden (1991), Gyldendal
 Dansk dynamit (1990), Forskningspolitisk Råd
 Den blå himmel (1987), Munksgaard
 Videnskabsvurdering (1987), Gyldendal
 Naturvidenskab og ikke-viden (1987), Kimære
 Det udelelige (1985), Gyldendal
 Kosmos eller kaos (1984), Tiderne Skifter
 Kræftens frie spil (1980), Informations Forlag
 Om kapitalistisk naturvidenskab (1976), Modtryk

External links
 Website and blog of Tor Nørretranders
 Tor giving the "evening talk" at the Reboot Festival, 2009

References

1955 births
Living people
Danish science writers
Weekendavisen people